Xerocomellus porosporus is a small wild mushroom in the family Boletaceae. These mushrooms  have tubes and pores instead of gills beneath their caps. It is commonly known as the sepia bolete.

Taxonomy
This bolete was described and given the scientific name Xerocomus porosporus in 1958 by Louis Imler (1900 - 1993), who was the founder of the Antwerp Mycological Circle. The currently accepted scientific name Xerocomellus porosporus dates from a 2008 publication by Czech mycologist Josef Å utara, whose studied in detail morphological character of this and other closely related boletes – since further supported by DNA studies.

Description
Varying in colour from putty beige to dull brown, or olivaceous.
The stem is usually with very little red, and is olivaceous, more yellow at the apex, and bruises brown. The flesh is pale lemon yellow or buff in the cap, and chrome yellow in the stem apex. It darkens to dark brick or vinaceous towards the base. The pores are narrow, 0.2–0.5 mm in diameter, angular, lemon yellow, and darken later. They also bruise blue. The spores give an olive-brown spore print. At microscopic level this bolete has truncate (chopped off) spores; the spore dimensions are 13–15 by 4–5 µm.

Distribution and habitat
Xerocomellus porosporus appears occasionally in the autumn, and grows singly or in small groups in mixed deciduous woods, particularly with oak, hornbeams, and beech. This species is widespread in northern temperate zones, but somewhat rare in Europe.

Edibility
Xerocomellus porosporus is edible but of little culinary value, being bland, and mushy when cooked.

See also
 List of Boletus species

References

Index Fungorum
Mycobank

Fungi of Europe
Fungi of North America
Boletaceae
Fungi described in 1958